Thrymr , or Saturn XXX, is a natural satellite of Saturn. It was discovered by Gladman and colleagues in 2000, and given the temporary designation S/2000 S 7. Its name comes from Norse mythology, where Thrymr is a Jotun.

Thrymr is about 7 kilometres in diameter, and orbits Saturn at an average distance of 20,810 Mm in 1120.809 days. It may have formed from debris knocked off Phoebe. The Thrymian orbit is retrograde, at an inclination of 175° to the ecliptic (151° to Saturn's equator) and with an eccentricity of 0.453. Like Ijiraq and Kiviuq, Thrymr's orbit overlaps strongly with Phoebe's such that it is likely to collide with it in the future.

Its rotation period is  hours, the slowest among the retrograde moons measured by Cassini–Huygens and the second-slowest after Tarqeq. Having two maxima and two minima in its light curve, it may therefore be a contact binary, although this is less likely than for Kiviuq and Bestla. The surface of Thrymr is gray in color and similar to those of Suttungr and Mundilfari, suggesting a common origin as fragments knocked off of Phoebe early in the Solar System's history. In particular, it may be part of the same dynamical family as Suttungr, though S/2004 S 7 is probably more closely related.

Its name was announced in its oblique form Thrym in IAU Circular 8177. However, the IAU Working Group on Planetary System Nomenclature later decided to add the nominative suffix -r to the root Thrym.

References

 IAUC 7538: S/2000 S 7, S/2000 S 8, S/2000 S 9 December 7, 2000 (discovery)
 MPEC 2000-Y15: S/2000 S 1, S/2000 S 2, S/2000 S 7, S/2000 S 8, S/2000 S 9 December 19, 2000 (discovery and ephemeris)
 IAUC 8177: Satellites of Jupiter and Saturn August 8, 2003 (naming the moon Thrym)
 IAUC 8471: Satellites of Saturn, January 21, 2005 (correcting the name)

Further reading
Cassini Mission: Thrymr

Norse group
Moons of Saturn
Irregular satellites
Discoveries by Brett J. Gladman
Astronomical objects discovered in 2000
Moons with a retrograde orbit